Papaipema eryngii, the rattlesnake-master borer, is a species of cutworm or dart moth in the family Noctuidae. It is found in North America. It bores into the rattlesnake master, Eryngium yuccifolium at the stalk, inverts and develops, killing the plant in the process. In order to mature, the moth needs a mature rattlesnake master or multiple young stalks.

References

Further reading

 
 
 

Papaipema
Articles created by Qbugbot
Moths described in 1917